Connor's House is a single storey dwelling in Stirling Terrace, Toodyay, Western Australia.

It was constructed circa 1890 for Daniel Connor. The building is heritage listed, and considered to have historical significance as a remaining example of Toodyay's development in the 1890s. It is also considered to have social significance as evidence of the way people lived in the late 19th century, and contributes to the aesthetics of Stirling Terrace, the main road in Toodyay.

A verandah extends across the full extent of the front of the building, with an enclosed bricked lower section replacing the original wooden balustrades in about 1960. There are three sections to the house, each with its own verandah access and front door. This house is the third building erected by Daniel Connor on this particular landholding (originally known as lot 9) which spans the corner of Stirling Terrace and Piesse Street. The other two buildings are Connor's Mill and Connor's Cottage.

References

Buildings and structures in Toodyay, Western Australia
Stirling Terrace, Toodyay